Santi Gucci (c. 1530–1600) was an Italian architect and sculptor.

Biography
He moved to Poland after 1550, most probably from Florence, and became the court artist of king Sigismund II Augustus of Poland, his sister Anna Jagiellonka and his successor Stefan Batory of Poland. Santi Gucci's workshop in Pińczów became a notable school which attracted many future artists and became one of the centres of Mannerist art and culture in Poland. For his merits for the Polish crown he was ennobled, accepted into the ranks of the szlachta and given a Zetynian Coat of Arms.

One of the most successful and fruitful artists of his epoch, Gucci built or reconstructed a number of palaces of notable people in all parts of the Polish Republic. Among them was the Firlej family castle in Janowiec on the Vistula (1565–1585), for whom he also sculpted a Mannerist tomb in a local parish church (c. 1586). For the Piotr Myszkowski family he erected a new palace in Książ Wielki (1585–1595), Mirów Castle. He also erected the Łobzów palace (1585–1587), in Kraków, and expanded the castle in Pińczów (1591–1600). He is also supposed to be the architect of the Pińczów synagogue.

One of his most notable works is the integral design and funerary monuments in the Bartolommeo Berrecci's Sigismund's Chapel in the Wawel Cathedral. The chapel, often referred to as the pearl of Italian Renaissance north of the Alps, housed the graves of King Sigismund Augustus of Poland and Anna Jagiellonka. Between 1594 and 1595 he also refurbished the Mariacka Chapel to house the tomb of Stefan Batory. Others among his major works include the Branicki family chapel in Niepołomice (1596) and St. Anne's Chapel in Pińczów.

Gallery

Sources

1530s births
1600 deaths
16th-century Italian architects
Italian Renaissance architects
Architects from Florence
16th-century Italian sculptors
Italian male sculptors
Year of birth uncertain
Italy–Poland relations
Italian emigrants to Poland
Renaissance architects